Our Lady of the Sacred Heart College may refer to:
Our Lady of the Sacred Heart College, Adelaide, Australia
Our Lady of the Sacred Heart College, Australia, abbreviated as OLSH Bentleigh
Our Lady of the Sacred Heart College, Sydney, Australia
Our Lady of the Sacred Heart College, Guimba, Nueva Ecija, the Philippines